Evgeny Konnov (born 19 November 1992 in Chirchiq, Uzbekistan) is a Russian pianist. He is the winner of many competitions, the most important of them: 2018 first prize and public prize at the 64th Maria Canals International Music Competition in Barcelona, 2019 first prize and public prize at the 31st International Ettore Pozzoli Piano Competition in Seregno, 2020 first prize at the 14th Unisa International Piano Competition in South Africa. In the season 2020/2021 he was an artist in residence at the Staatstheater Augsburg. His debut album was released by Naxos in 2022 with piano sonatas by the Catalan composer Antonio Soler and was highly acclaimed by the international press.

Music education

Evgeny Konnov began to study piano at the age of four with Natalia Krivosheina, and in 1999 he entered in the Gnesin Music School in Moscow, Russia under Tatiana Sarkisians supervision. From 2008 to 2012 he studied at the Academic Music College in Moscow, Russia with Natalia Syslova. From 2012 to 2013 he studied at the Robert Schumann Hochschule in Düsseldorf, Germany under Professor Georg Friedrich Schenck supervision. From 2013 to 2021 he studied with Evgenia Rubinova at the Leopold Mozart Centre in Augsburg, Germany and from 2017 to 2021 with Professor Albert Mamriev at the Music Academy "Neue Sterne" in Hannover, Germany.

In 2019 he began studying with Professor Jan Gottlieb Jiracek von Arnim at the University of Music and Performing Arts Vienna.

Career

Konnov has given concerts in numerous concert halls in Germany (Gasteig), Spain (National Auditorium of Music, Palau de la Música Catalana, Euskalduna Conference Centre and Concert Hall, Auditorio Manuel de Falla, Museu Nacional d'Art de Catalunya, L'Auditori), Portugal (Casa da Música), (France Salle Cortot in Paris), Russia (Great Hall of Moscow Conservatory), Italy (Teatro Dal Verme, Casa di Riposo per Musicisti), Austria (Konzerthaus, Vienna), Brussels (Flagey Building), Japan (Act City Hamamatsu), Netherlands, Poland, Malta, Uzbekistan, South Africa and Morocco. 

He has performed as soloist with Orquesta Sinfónica de Madrid, Orquesta Sinfónica de Tenerife, Bilbao Orkestra Sinfonikoa, City of Granada Orchestra, Jove Orquestra Nacional de Catalunya, Johannesburg Philharmonic Orchestra, Augsburger Philharmoniker, Orquestra Internacional Virtuosos de Madrid, Orchestra Filarmonica Mihail Jora di Bacau, Orchestra Sinfonica Citta di Grosseto, Orchestra Antonio Vivaldi, Orchestra Sinfonica di Sanremo, Ryazan Symphony Orchestra, Philharmonic Orchestra Wernigerode, Vienna City Orchestra, Orquestra Filarmonica Portuguesa.

Many of his recordings and interviews were broadcast by radio and television broadcasters: BBC Radio, Radio Orpheus, RTBF, augsburg.tv, TGR, Russia-K and others.

He also takes part as a jury member at such competitions as Compositores de España International Piano Competition in Las Rozas de Madrid
, Clavis Bavaria and A. Scriabin International Piano Competition in Grosseto.

Awards

References 

Russian pianists
1992 births
People from Chirchiq
Living people